Hendrik "Henk" Kamerbeek (13 September 1893 – 30 November 1954) was a Dutch hammer thrower. He competed at the 1924 and 1928 Summer Olympics with the best result of 10th place in 1928. After retiring from competitions, he was chairman of the athletics section of the Philips Sports Club (PSV). His son Eef, also an Olympic athlete, later succeeded him in this function. Henk Kamerbeek died one week after a tragic accident at work.

References

1893 births
1954 deaths
Athletes (track and field) at the 1924 Summer Olympics
Athletes (track and field) at the 1928 Summer Olympics
Dutch male hammer throwers
Olympic athletes of the Netherlands
People from Zeist
Philips employees
Sportspeople from Utrecht (province)
20th-century Dutch people